Trail Motorsports (formerly HighLine Performance Group, FitzBradshaw Racing and Fitz Motorsports) was a NASCAR team based in Mooresville, North Carolina, which is near Charlotte. The team is owned by Armando Fitz and Art Shelton, and was previously co-owned by Fitz's former wife Mimi. The team was known as the HighLine Performance Group until the end of the 2001 season when they teamed up with Terry Bradshaw and formally created FitzBradshaw Racing. At the end of the 2004 season FBR announced that it was partnering with Chip Ganassi Racing with Felix Sabates which gave them access to more technical and engineering support. In addition to the partnership they would also be switching manufacturers from Chevrolet to Dodge. The team also formed a partnership with Michael Waltrip Racing for the 2006 season. Bradshaw left the organization at the end of the 2006 season. The team changed its name to Trail Motorsports in early 2009 after Shelton came on board. The team fielded the No. 22 Dodge Charger for Johnny Borneman III in the NASCAR Nationwide Series, the No. 32 Chevrolet Silverado for Chase Austin in the NASCAR Camping World Truck Series, and the No. 58 Chevrolet Impala driven by Jarit Johnson, younger brother of seven-time Sprint Cup champion Jimmie Johnson, in the Camping World East Series.

Sprint Cup Series
While the team was called FitzBradshaw, Trail briefly ran a Cup operation in 2002 with Kerry Earnhardt driving No. 83 RacingUSA.com/Aaron's Chevrolet. The car was fielded with support from Dale Earnhardt, Inc. The team had planned to run full-time in Cup by 2004. Earnhardt failed in each of his attempts, due to rain cancelling qualifying at all three events. Ron Hornaday Jr. qualified for that year's Checker Auto Parts 500, finishing 36th. Earnhardt attempted three more races in 2003 with sponsorship from Aaron's, Supercuts, and Hot Tamales, but also failed to qualify.

Nationwide Series

Beginnings 
Armando Fitz's team started as a two-car operation during the 2001 season. He and his wife, Mimi, purchased the team from Team SABCO, owned by his father-in-law and current Sprint Cup Series co-owner Felix Sabates at the end of the 2000 season. The team, then known as the HighLine Performance Group ran the No. 8 Chevrolet and No. 11 Chevrolet. Blaise Alexander began the season in the No. 8 car, but after four races, the team cut back to a part-time schedule. Frank Kimmel, Jeff Falk, Michael Dokken, Jason Rudd, Mario Hernandez, Mark Voigt, and Josh Richeson all shared time in the car over the season, with the No. 8 team finishing 42nd in owner's points. Marty Houston drove the newly renumbered No. 11 car at the beginning of the year, his best finish being a 13th at the NAPA Auto Parts 300, but he was replaced by Ron Hornaday Jr. after the Outback Steakhouse 300. Hornaday had two top-tens but was released before the season was over, and was replaced by Todd Bodine who had one top-five in three races at the end of the season. Andy Santerre and Tim Fedewa also ran races in the car. The No. 11 car ended 21st in owner points, with Bodine finishing 29th in points.

Car No. 22 history 

In 2002, the newly formed FitzBradshaw Racing signed Supercuts, 10-10-220, Hot Tamales, and Jani-King as sponsors and Kerry Earnhardt as the driver of the team's No. 12 Chevrolet. The team also formed a technical alliance with Dale Earnhardt, Inc., receiving engines and engineering support from DEI. Earnhardt had two top-fives and finished 22nd in points. Earnhardt did not have a top-ten finish in 2003, and was released after the Tropicana Twister 300. Tim Fedewa, who had been Earnhardt's spotter since 2002, and crew chief for a single race, replaced him for the balance of the season. Fedewa finished in the top-20 eight times. Fedewa had five top-tens in 2004, and finished sixteenth in points. Fedewa struggled in 2005, and did not finish in the top-ten, causing him to be released after Pikes Peak. Joel Kauffman, Paul Wolfe, Carlos Contreras, Kertus Davis, Sterling Marlin, and Steadman Marlin all shared the ride for the rest of the season. In 2006, the No. 12 car has seen several different drivers through the first 25 races of the season. Joel Kauffman was slated to run the full schedule for the team this year, however after struggling the team scaled back his schedule. David Reutimann ran the car at Daytona because Kauffman had not received approval for superspeedway racing. Tracy Hines and Mike Skinner drove the car in multiple races. For the 2007 season, Fitz Motorsports switched to the No. 22 and signed David Stremme and Mike Bliss as their principal drivers. Both drivers had great success in the No. 22, with Bliss scoring the team's best finish of second at Memphis. When the team came to Montreal for the inaugural NAPA Auto Parts 200, the team - in a last-second decision - placed Canadian CART regular Patrick Carpentier in the car. Carpentier won the pole position for the race and charged from 6th with less than 2 laps to go to finish second to Kevin Harvick.

Bliss returned in 2008 to drive full-time, but left for Phoenix Racing after six races, and was replaced by various Cup drivers including Robby Gordon and Reed Sorenson. Michael Waltrip Racing development driver Josh Wise became the new driver for thirteen races with one top-five finish. Of note, Fitz switched temporarily to Toyota during Wise's runs with the team. A wide variety of drivers including ex-Champ Car driver Andrew Ranger, 2008 Daytona 500 winner Ryan Newman, Jarit Johnson, and Joe Gibbs Racing development driver Marc Davis, took over for the rest of the season. This team shut down in early 2009.

Car No. 36 history 

The team expanded to two cars in 2003 halfway through the season as the United States Navy came aboard to sponsor the No. 14 for nine races. Casey Atwood debuted the car at Kentucky Speedway, bringing it home in 9th place. Atwood ran 11 races that year, posting four top-ten finishes. Atwood came back in 2004, and had seven top-tens, when he was dismissed after Lowe's. His immediate replacement was Dave Blaney for one race, with Braun Racing's David Stremme named as his permanent replacement. As part of the arrangement to bring Stremme to the team, FitzBradshaw agreed to align themselves with Chip Ganassi Racing, who had him under contract as part of a driver development deal. This would allow the team to finish the season as a Chevrolet team, but beginning the next year both the No. 12 and the No. 14 would switch to Dodge as Ganassi's team was fielding the vehicles at the time.

Stremme ran the No. 14 full-time in 2005, and had ten top-tens, finishing 13th in points, before moving up to compete in the NEXTEL Cup series. Tracy Hines was hired to run in the No. 14 Dodge for the 2006 season, however sponsorship issues forced the team to compete on a limited basis. Steadman Marlin competed for the team in two races and A. J. Foyt IV competed in one race for the team. It was announced in July 2006 that Family Dollar would sponsor the car for nine races and the team would feature Ricky Craven, Carlos Contreras, and Mike Skinner as drivers. Fitz Motorsports changed the car number to No. 44 for 2007 and Rubén Pardo qualified for the team's first race at the Telcel-Motorola México 200, followed up by another start at Nashville Superspeedway. Mike Bliss also drove the No. 44 with Family Dollar sponsorship at Lowe's Motor Speedway in May 2007. For 2008, Kenny Wallace was signed to drive the No. 36 with sponsorship from Shark Energy Drink. Although Wallace missed the season opener at Daytona, he ran all following races until owner Armando Fitz announced on March 17 that the No. 36 team would only run part-time due to a lack of product distribution, and the owner points of the 36 were switched the No. 28 of Wallace's new team. The No. 36 began running part-time with Pardo and Charles Lewandoski driving midway through the season.

Car No. 40 history 

The third FitzBradshaw car made its debut in 2003, with Jimmy Spencer driving the No. 82 Jani-King Chevrolet at Texas, finishing sixth. Casey Atwood attempted the Charlotte spring race in the No. 82 NAVY Chevrolet, failing to qualify. Atwood later drove the car at the Tropicana Twister 300 sponsored by Jani-King, finishing 21st. Randy LaJoie drove the car again at Phoenix, finishing 14th. LaJoie continued to run the car part-time in 2004 with sponsorship from Jani-King and Goulds Pumps, his best finish being 13th at Las Vegas. Dave Blaney also ran two races in the car.

In 2005, the team became a driver development team for Chip Ganassi Racing, and switched to Ganassi's No. 40 with sponsorship from Jani-King and Cottman Transmission. Sterling Marlin began the season with the team, with Carlos Contreras and Ganassi development driver Scott Lagasse Jr. filling in. Towards the end of the season, Contreras, Paul Wolfe, and Erin Crocker got majority of the starts in the car. Reed Sorenson ran the Aaron's 312 at Atlanta in March in the car after the transmission on his regular No. 41 Discount Tire car mysteriously locked up during qualifying for the race. For 2006, Michael Waltrip purchased the team's owners points and began a partnership with FBR to run the No. 99 Aaron's Dodge.

Other series 
In addition to the Busch Series, Fitz Motorsports operated race teams in other series as well. In 2007, they fielded entries in the NASCAR Busch East Series with Ruben Pardo as the team's driver, with Pierre Borque racing on a part-time basis, and the NASCAR Mexico Series, where Carlos Pardo drove the team's FitzContreras Racing entry, along with development driver Maxime Dumarey.

In 2007, the team partnered with Hyper Sport to race in the Grand-Am Road Racing series.

Ruben Pardo raced in 2008 in the East Series for Fitz. For 2009, former Rusty Wallace Racing driver Chase Austin was to drive the No. 32 Chevrolet in the Camping World Truck Series and Jarit Johnson, younger brother of five time Sprint Cup champion Jimmie Johnson was to drive in the Camping World East Series. However, the team shut down before their plans could come to fruition.

References

External links
Trail Motorsports Homepage
Armando Fitz - NASCAR Owner
Fitz Contreras Vazquez racing team Official Website

 (Terry Bradshaw)

American auto racing teams
2001 establishments in North Carolina
Companies disestablished in 2009
Companies based in Charlotte, North Carolina
Defunct NASCAR teams
Defunct sports teams in North Carolina
2009 disestablishments in North Carolina
Companies established in 2001